Burmeia leesi is a moth in the family Epicopeiidae. It is found in Burma.

The wingspan is about 28.5 mm for males and 31.5 mm for females. The forewings are dark brown to blackish, with five white areas. The hindwings are white with a dark brown terminal band, with four submarginal white spots. It is probably a day-flying species.

Etymology
The genus name refers to the country where the type-species occurs. The species is named after Dr. David C. Lees (BMNH).

References

Moths described in 2002
Epicopeiidae